Canlis is a fine dining restaurant serving  New American and Pacific Northwest cuisine in Seattle, Washington. Situated  in the Queen Anne neighborhood, the restaurant has views of Gas Works Park and the Cascade Mountains. It was built by Peter Canlis in 1950, and remains family-owned. The restaurant currently employs 94 people.

It is one of the most award-winning restaurants in the greater Northwest; it is ranked one of the top 20 restaurants in America by Gourmet Magazine, Canlis has been hailed by The New York Times as "Seattle's fanciest, finest restaurant for over 60 years". Since 1997, Canlis has been a recipient of the Wine Spectator Grand Award.

History

The restaurant was built by Peter Canlis and opened on December 11, 1950. Prior to coming to Seattle, Peter had run the Canlis Charcoal Broiler which opened in 1946 in Honolulu, Hawaii. He was convinced to open a Seattle location by Jack Peterson, a local contractor who had met Canlis on a trip to Hawaii. Peter hired local architect Roland Terry to design the Seattle building which soon became an icon for Northwest-inspired Modern architecture. Peter later opened additional Canlis restaurants in Honolulu (1954), Portland (1959), and San Francisco (1965). The restaurant is "credited with inventing Northwest cuisine when it opened in 1950", and Peter Canlis is personally credited for "singlehandedly develop[ing] what's now known as Pacific Northwest cuisine". In 1977, Peter Canlis died of lung cancer and his son, Chris Canlis, took over the restaurant with his wife, Alice. The couple ran Canlis for thirty years before handing off ownership to their sons, Mark and Brian Canlis.

Canlis usually features a live pianist; Walt Wagner played there from 1996 to 2016.

Awards
Food & Wine: Jason Franey Best New Chef 2011
Wine Spectator: Grand Award Winner 1997–2017
James Beard Awards: Outstanding wine program 2017

See also
 List of New American restaurants
 List of Pacific Northwest restaurants

References

Further reading

External links 
Official website
Canlis Salad Recipe

Restaurants established in 1950
Restaurants in Seattle
New American restaurants
1950 establishments in Washington (state)
American companies established in 1950
Defunct restaurants in Portland, Oregon
Pacific Northwest restaurants